The 1984–85 DePaul Blue Demons men's basketball team represented DePaul University during the 1984–85 NCAA Division I men's basketball season. They were led by new head coach Joey Meyer, in his 1st season after ten years as an assistant, and played their home games at the Rosemont Horizon in Rosemont.

Roster

Schedule and results

|-
!colspan=9 style=| Regular Season

|-
!colspan=12 style=| NCAA Tournament

Source:

Rankings

References 

DePaul Blue Demons men's basketball seasons
DePaul
1984 in sports in Illinois
1985 in sports in Illinois
DePaul